Kristi Johnson may refer to:

 Kristi Overton Johnson (born 1970), American water skiing champion, author, and missionary
 Kristi Haskins Johnson, Solicitor General of Mississippi